Edward J. Scott (born September 15, 1944) is an American soap opera producer. Born and raised in Santa Monica, California, Scott earned a Bachelor of Arts from California State University at Northridge with a double major of anthropology and broadcasting journalism. He has been married since 1985 to actress Melody Thomas Scott, who is best known for her role as Nikki Newman on The Young and the Restless. The couple, who have three daughters: Jennifer, Alexandra and Elizabeth, recently renewed their wedding vows on their 20th anniversary in an Entertainment Tonight special, ranked #1 in its timeslot.

Career

Five-time Emmy Award-winning executive producer Edward Scott is currently partnered with producer/writer Brendan Burns in the film and television production company Scott / Burns.  Most recently, Scott received a 2009 Daytime Emmy Award nomination for “Outstanding Daytime Drama” as executive producer of the NBC daytime drama Days of Our Lives (August 2007 – August 2008), securing a record 13 nominations, the most Emmy Award nominations for the 2008 season in all major categories than any other daytime drama, according to TV Guide. 
 
Formerly executive producer of the #1-ranked CBS Television daytime drama, The Young and the Restless for over 25 years, Scott helmed the daytime drama through its current, record-breaking, 20 year plus, 1,000 week plus reign as the #1 American daytime television drama, according to Nielsen. Under the Scott regime, CBS Television also secured the #1 dominance in the day part, a record it has held for more than two decades, according to Nielsen.

Scott had a 25-year producing partnership and creative collaboration with William J. Bell and Lee Phillip Bell, the co-creators of The Young and the Restless and The Bold and the Beautiful, the two most popular daily American television series worldwide. Both daytime dramas are syndicated internationally to a combined total of over 125 markets worldwide, with a combined daily viewing audience in excess of 100 million viewers on six continents.

During Scott’s tenure as executive producer of The Young & The Restless, the series received five Emmy Awards for “Outstanding Daytime Drama,” accumulating more Emmy nominations in that category and in all other categories than any other drama series in the history of the National Academy of Television Arts & Sciences. In 2000 alone, the series received 28 Emmy Award nominations, a record for both American primetime and daytime television, an accomplishment acknowledged by the Guinness Book of World Records.  Scott received a total of 5 Emmy Awards (2007, 1993, 1986, 1985, 1983) and 14 Emmy nominations for “Outstanding Daytime Drama” for The Young and The Restless.

Under Scott's leadership, the show also received “The People’s Choice Award, The TV Guide Reader’s Poll, and more NAACP Image Awards for “Outstanding Daytime Drama” than any other American television series, primetime or daytime.

Upcoming Projects

Scott is in a producing partnership with producer/screenwriter Brendan Burns on the following film and television projects:

Covert: My Years Infiltrating the Mob by NBA referee Bob Delaney; partnered with Larry Spiegal and Judy Goldstein, producers.;
Cast No Shadows, by Mary S. Lovell. The spellbinding true story of Betty Pack, American debutante-turned-spy who, with seductive ingenuity became a legendary super spy. Betty Pack literally changed the course of WWII.
Freshwater Road, as the award-winning novel by Denise Nicholas about a young woman’s coming-of-age during the Freedom Summer of 1964, hailed by the Washington Post as “The best work of fiction on the Civil Rights Movements since The Autobiography of Miss Jane Pittman.” partnered with Denise Nicholas and Frank Tobin.
Hidden Valor: The Women of the SOE, an event WW II miniseries, from a story and treatment by Burns, based upon the exploits of Nancy Wake, the most decorated woman in World War II and five other extraordinary women. These women were trained in weapons, explosives, sabotage and silent killing, all possessing, as their commander put it, “essential guts.”
Flawless: a provocative contemporary noir  thriller in the tradition of Body Heat and Unfaithful. Screenplay by Burns.

Positions held
The Young and the Restless (CBS)
Associate producer (1976–1978)
Producer (1978–1986)
Executive producer (1986–2001)
Supervising producer (2004 – June 15, 2007)

Days of Our Lives (NBC)
Executive consultant (July 25, 2007 – August 29, 2007)
Co-Executive producer (August 30, 2007 to September 16, 2008)

The Bold and the Beautiful (CBS)
Producer (September 2010 – 2011)
Supervising producer (2011–present)

Awards and nominations
Edward J.Scott has been nominated and won numerous times for Daytime Emmys and Producers Guild of America Awards.

Daytime Emmy Awards Year Result Award Category

2009  (Nominated) Daytime Emmy Outstanding Drama Series
for: "Days of our Lives"

 
2008  (Nominated) Daytime Emmy Outstanding Drama Series
for: "The Young and the Restless"

 
2007  (Won) Daytime Emmy Outstanding Drama Series
for: "The Young and the Restless"

 
  
2006  (Nominated) Daytime Emmy Outstanding Drama Series
for: "The Young and the Restless" 
Shared with:
William J. Bell (executive producer) 
John F. Smith (co-executive producer) 
John C. Fisher (coordinating producer) 
Kathryn Foster (producer)

 
  
2005  (Nominated) Daytime Emmy Outstanding Drama Series
for: "The Young and the Restless" 
Shared with:
William J. Bell (executive producer) 
John F. Smith (co-executive producer) 
Kathryn Foster (producer) 
John C. Fisher (coordinating producer)

 
  
2002  (Nominated) Daytime Emmy Outstanding Drama Series
for: "The Young and the Restless" 
Shared with:
William J. Bell (senior executive producer) 
David Shaughnessy (supervising producer) 
Nancy Wiard (senior coordinating producer)

 
  
2001  (Nominated) Daytime Emmy Outstanding Drama Series
for: "The Young and the Restless" 
Shared with:
William J. Bell (senior executive producer) 
David Shaughnessy (supervising producer) 
Nancy Wiard (senior coordinating producer)

 
  
2000  (Nominated) Daytime Emmy Outstanding Drama Series
for: "The Young and the Restless" 
Shared with:
William J. Bell (senor executive producer) 
David Shaughnessy 
Nancy Wiard (senior coordinating producer)

 
  
1999  (Nominated) Daytime Emmy Outstanding Drama Series
for: "The Young and the Restless" 
Shared with:
William J. Bell (executive producer) 
David Shaughnessy 
Nancy Wiard (coordinating producer)

 
  
1998  (Nominated) Daytime Emmy Outstanding Drama Series
for: "The Young and the Restless" 
Shared with:
William J. Bell (senior executive producer) 
David Shaughnessy (producer) 
Nancy Wiard (coordinating producer)

 
  
1993  (Won) Daytime Emmy Outstanding Drama Series
for: "The Young and the Restless" 
Shared with:
William J. Bell (executive producer) 
David Shaughnessy 
Nancy Wiard (coordinating producer)

 
  
1992  (Nominated) Daytime Emmy Outstanding Drama Series
for: "The Young and the Restless" 
Shared with:
William J. Bell (senior executive producer) 
David Shaughnessy (producer) 
Nancy Wiard (coordinating producer)

 
  
1991  (Nominated) Daytime Emmy Outstanding Drama Series
for: "The Young and the Restless" 
Shared with:
William J. Bell (senior executive producer) 
Tom Langan (producer) 
Nancy Wiard (coordinating producer)

 
  
1990  (Nominated) Daytime Emmy Outstanding Drama Series
for: "The Young and the Restless" (1973)
Shared with:
William J. Bell (senior executive producer) 
Tom Langan (producer) 
Nancy Wiard (coordinating producer)

 
  
1989  (Nominated) Daytime Emmy Outstanding Drama Series
for: "The Young and the Restless" 
Shared with:
William J. Bell (executive producer) 
Tom Langan (producer)

 
  
1988  (Nominated) Daytime Emmy Outstanding Drama Series
for: "The Young and the Restless" (1973)
Shared with:
William J. Bell (executive producer) 
Tom Langan (producer)

 
  
1987  (Nominated) Daytime Emmy Outstanding Drama Series
for: "The Young and the Restless" 
Shared with:
William J. Bell (executive producer) 
Wes Kenney (executive producer) 
Tom Langan (producer)

 
  
1986  (Won) Daytime Emmy Outstanding Drama Series
for: "The Young and the Restless" 
Shared with:
William J. Bell (executive producer) 
Wes Kenney (executive producer) 
Tom Langan

 
  
1985  (Won) Daytime Emmy Outstanding Daytime Drama Series
for: "The Young and the Restless" 
Shared with:
Wes Kenney (executive producer) 
William J. Bell (executive producer)

 
  
1983  (Won) Daytime Emmy Outstanding Daytime Drama Series
for: "The Young and the Restless"

 
  
1979  (Nominated) Daytime Emmy Outstanding Daytime Drama Series
for: "The Young and the Restless"

Executive Producing Tenure

References

External links
NBC Daytime: DOOL
  Scott/Burns Productions

American television producers
Soap opera producers
Daytime Emmy Award winners
American soap opera writers
1944 births
Living people
People from Santa Monica, California